Cumaral is a town and municipality in the Meta Department, Colombia.

Born in Cumaral 
 Dario Robayo, harpist
Iya Bahamón Merrill, Designer of Interiors

References 

Municipalities of Meta Department